Jefea brevifolia, the shortleaf jefea, is a North American species of flowering plants in the family Asteraceae. It is native to northern Mexico, and the southwestern and south-central United States, in Chihuahua, Coahuila, Durango, Nuevo León, Zacatecas, San Luis Potosí, Texas, and New Mexico

Jefea brevifolia is a small branching shrub, woody at the base but producing long flower stalks. Each stalk has one flower head at the top, each head containing 3-20 ray flowers and 30-100 disc flowers.

References

Heliantheae
Flora of North America
Plants described in 1852